The Great Western Railway (GWR) 4400 Class was a class of 2-6-2T side tank steam locomotive.

History 
They were introduced in 1904 for work on small branch lines. The 4500 class was a later development with larger driving wheels. The 4400s were particularly used in hilly districts, notably the Princetown and Much Wenlock Branches. All were withdrawn and scrapped between 1949 and 1955.

See also
GWR 4500 Class
GWR 4575 Class
 List of GWR standard classes with two outside cylinders

References

External links 

Class 4400 Details at Rail UK

2-6-2T locomotives
4400
Standard gauge steam locomotives of Great Britain
Railway locomotives introduced in 1904
Scrapped locomotives